The 2013 Donegal county football team season was the franchise's 109th season since the County Board's foundation in 1905. The team entered the season as defending All-Ireland champions after winning Sam Maguire MMXII.

Jim McGuinness returned for his third season as the team's manager. Pioneer of the game's revolutionary tactic The System, he entered the season with two Ulster titles (2011, 2012). Attempting to secure an unprecedented three-in-a-row this season, his men came undone in the final game of the series against Monaghan. Two games later they lost their All-Ireland crown against Mayo.

Competitions

Dr McKenna Cup

League

Ulster Senior Football Championship

All-Ireland Senior Football Championship

Panel
The following were called into the senior panel for the 2013 Dr McKenna Cup.

Minor panel
 Correct as of 17 April 2013.

Notes

Management team
Manager: Jim McGuinness (senior team)
Selectors: Rory Gallagher, Maxi Curran, Pat Shovelin
Surgical consultant: Kevin Moran
Team doctor: Charlie McManus
Team physio: Dermot Simpson 
Physiotherapists: Charlie Molloy, Paul Coyle, Donal Reid, JD.
Manager: Stephen Friel (minor team)

Awards

Footballer of the Year
Michael Murphy

References

Donegal county football team seasons